Baoli is a village in Baraut Tehsil of District Baghpat, India. It is located 25 KM towards North from District head quarters Bagpat. 3 KM from Baraut. 517 KM from State capital Lucknow.Baoli is a largest village in Baghpat District.
In Baoli village population of children with age 0-6 is 1195 which makes up 12.09 % of total population of village. Average Sex Ratio of Baoli village is 825 which is lower than Uttar Pradesh state average of 912. Child Sex Ratio for the Baoli as per census is 850, lower than Uttar Pradesh average of 902.

References

External links
http://www.gloriousindia.com/unleashed/place.php?id=276909

Villages in Bagpat district